Tiziano Rossi (born in Milan, 1935) is an Italian poet. He is well known for his published books of poetry, but in 2020 he also published a collection of short tales.

Biography
Son of the painter Giovanni Rossi, as a poet he is considered an important exponent of the well known Lombard line (a category which id to be understood in a broad sense, not coinciding perfectly with the geographical area). In his poetry it is often clear a civil wish to defend life from industrial and technology invasions. He is the editor (with Ermanno Krumm) of the anthological work Poesia italiana del Novecento, with a preface by Mario Luzi (Milan: 1995).
He won the Viareggio Prize for poetry in 2000.
In 2020 he published a collection of poetical, sarcastic anti-fairy tale (antifavole). In the same year he adheres at the Empathic Movement (Empathism).
He won Cilento Poetry Prize in 2022.

Selected works
La talpa imperfetta, Milano, Mondadori, 1968
Dallo sdrucciolare al rialzarsi, Milano, Guanda, 1976
Miele e no, Milano, Garzanti, 1988 
Il movimento dell'adagio, Milano, Garzanti, 1993
Pare che il Paradiso, Milano, Garzanti, 1998
Gente di corsa, Milano, Garzanti, 2000 
Tutte le poesie (1963-2000), Milano, Garzanti, 2003
Cronaca perduta, Milano, Mondadori, 2006
Faccende laterali, Milano, Garzanti, 2009
Spigoli del sonno, Milano, Mursia, 2012
Piccola orchestra. Antifavole e dicerìe, Milano, La Vita Felice, 2020

Awards 

 Premio Nazionale Letterario Pisa
 Premio Nazionale Rhegium Julii
 Viareggio Prize
 Cilento Poetry Prize

Bibliografia
Giorgio Luzzi, Poesia italiana 1941-1988: la via lombarda. Diciannove poeti contemporanei scelti, antologizzati e introdotti da Giorgio Luzzi, Marcos y Marcos, Milano 1989.
Dizionario della letteratura italiana del Novecento, Torino, Einaudi, 1992, ad vocem.
Giulio Ferroni, Andrea Cortellessa, Italo Pantani, Silvia Tatti, Ricostruzione e sviluppo nel dopoguerra (1945-1968), vol XI of Storia e testi della letteratura italiana, Milano, Mondadori, 2005, p. 114.
On Encyclopædia Britannica: Tiziano Rossi | Italian author | Britannica

References 

Living people
Italian male poets
21st-century Italian poets
1935 births